Pierre Hurmic (born 10 April 1955) is a French politician serving as Mayor of Bordeaux since 2020. A member of Europe Ecology – The Greens (EELV), he was first elected to the municipal council of Bordeaux in 1995. In 2020, he defeated incumbent Nicolas Florian for the mayorship.

After twenty-five years in opposition to Alain Juppé and then Nicolas Florian, he was elected mayor of Bordeaux following the municipal elections of 2020, tilting the city,  historic bastion of the right for 73 years, in the camp of environmentalists and the left.

See also
List of mayors of Bordeaux

References

1955 births
Living people
Mayors of Bordeaux
Europe Ecology – The Greens politicians
Politicians from Nouvelle-Aquitaine
21st-century French politicians